Band-e Sar or Band Sar or Bandesar may refer to:
Band Sar, Ilam
Bandesar, Mazandaran
Band-e Sar, Qazvin
Band Sar, Chabahar, Sistan and Baluchestan Province
Band Sar Chukat, Chabahar County, Sistan and Baluchestan Province
Band Sar Molla Ahmad Bazar, Chabahar County, Sistan and Baluchestan Province